The 1998 Hastings Borough Council election took place on 7 May 1998 to elect members of Hastings Borough Council in East Sussex, England. One third of the council was up for election and the Labour Party gained overall control of the council from the Liberal Democrats.

After the election, the composition of the council was:
Labour 18
Liberal Democrat 13
Conservative 1

Election result
The Labour victories saw them gain a majority on Hastings Borough Council for the first time.

References

1998
1998 English local elections
1990s in East Sussex